Calyptoliva tatyanae is a species of sea snail, a marine gastropod mollusk in the family Olividae, the olives.

Description

Distribution
This marine species occurs off New Caledonia.

References

 Kantor Y.I. & Bouchet P. 2007. Out of Australia: Belloliva (Neogastropoda: Olividae) in the Coral Sea and New Caledonia. American Malacological Bulletin, 22(1-2): 22-73

Olividae
Gastropods described in 2007